Amadou Alimi is a Beninese long-distance runner. He competed in the men's 5000 metres at the 1980 Summer Olympics.

References

External links

Year of birth missing (living people)
Living people
Athletes (track and field) at the 1980 Summer Olympics
Beninese male long-distance runners
Olympic athletes of Benin
Place of birth missing (living people)